Corsiniaceae is a family of liverworts in the order Marchantiales.

Genera in the family Corsiniaceae 
 Corsinia
 Cronisia

References

Marchantiales
Liverwort families